Schimmel is a German and Dutch surname. Notable people with the surname include:
 Annemarie Schimmel (1922–2003), German Islam scholar
 Corrie Schimmel (born 1939), Dutch swimmer
 Hendrik Jan Schimmel (1823–1906), Dutch poet and novelist
 Henry S. Schimmel (1884–1975), American politician and judge
 Jason Schimmel (born 1978), American musician from the band Estradasphere
 Michael Schimmel (1896–1981), honorary trustee of Pace University
 Michael Schimmel Center for the Arts, principal theatre of pace University, New York City, named after Michael Schimmel
 Paul Schimmel (born 1940), American biophysical chemist 
 Paul Schimmel (curator) (born 1954), American curator of contemporary art 
 Robert Schimmel (1950–2010), American stand-up comedian
 Samantha Schimmel (born 1995), American porn actress as Janice Griffith
 Sean Schimmel, American swimming coach
 Shoni Schimmel (born 1992), American basketball player
 Sven Schimmel (born 1989), German football defender 
 Wilhelm Schimmel, German piano manufacturer founded by Wilhelm Schimmel (1854–1946)
 William Schimmel (born 1946), American accordionist

See also 
 Mold (German translation)
Schimmel-Conrades Science Center
 

German-language surnames
Dutch-language surnames